Onnicha Kamchomphu (Thai:อรณิชา คำชมภู, born 25 December 1997) is a Thai cricketer. She made her Women's Twenty20 International (WT20I) debut for Thailand on 4 June 2018, in the 2018 Women's Twenty20 Asia Cup.

On 13 August 2019, in the 2019 Netherlands Women's Quadrangular Series match against Ireland, Kamchomphu became the first bowler for Thailand to take a hat-trick in a WT20I match, finishing with three wickets for twelve runs from the two overs she bowled. She finished the tournament as the joint-leading wicket-taker, with nine dismissals from six matches. Later the same month, she was named in Thailand's squad for the 2019 ICC Women's World Twenty20 Qualifier tournament in Scotland. In January 2020, she was named in Thailand's squad for the 2020 ICC Women's T20 World Cup in Australia.

In November 2021, she was named in Thailand's team for the 2021 Women's Cricket World Cup Qualifier tournament in Zimbabwe. She played in Thailand's first match of the tournament, on 21 November 2021 against Zimbabwe.

In October 2022, she played for Thailand in Women's Twenty20 Asia Cup.

References

External links

 

 
1997 births
Living people
Onnicha Kamchomphu
Onnicha Kamchomphu
Onnicha Kamchomphu
Onnicha Kamchomphu
Onnicha Kamchomphu
Southeast Asian Games medalists in cricket
Competitors at the 2017 Southeast Asian Games